Austin Barrow was a state legislator in Arkansas. He represented Phillips County, Arkansas in the Arkansas House of Representatives in 1871.

References

Year of birth missing
Year of death missing
Members of the Arkansas House of Representatives
19th-century American politicians